Suhopolje is a settlement and an eponymous municipality in Slavonia, Croatia, located on the northern slopes of the Bilogora mountain in the region of Podravina, 10 km southeast of Virovitica; elevation 118 m. The population of the Suhopolje municipality is 6,683, with 2,696 people in Suhopolje itself and the rest in a number of surrounding villages.

Municipality
List of settlements in the municipality:

 Suhopolje
 Borova
 Budanica
 Bukova
 Cabuna
 Dvorska
 Gaćište
 Gvozdanska
 Jugovo Polje
 Levinovac
 Mala Trapinska
 Naudovac
 Orešac
 Pčelić
 Pepelana
 Pivnica Slavonska
 Rodin Potok
 Sovjak
 Trnava Cabunska
 Velika Trapinska
 Zvonimirovo
 Žiroslavje
 Žubrica

References

Municipalities of Croatia
Slavonia
Populated places in Virovitica-Podravina County